Politics of pakistanis one of the ideologies and systems upon which Pakistan was sought to be established in 1947 as a nation-state, as envisaged by the leader and founding father of the nation, Muhammad Ali Jinnah. Pakistan constitutionally is a democratic parliamentary republic with its political system based on an elected form of governance. Since the establishment of the current system in 2003, Pakistan is one of the youngest democracies in the world. The democratic elections held in 2008 were the first to conclude a complete 5-year term in the nations' political history.

History 
The Indus valley civilization, present in the area which is now Pakistan was one of the earliest and largest ancient human civilisations alongside Mesopotamia, the Nile Valley, Anatolia and ancient China, known for its highly developed, sophisticated and urbanised culture and much later also old Greece which had some form of democratic rule.

Historians and social scientists studying the civilisation's social structure observe that the Indus Valley had an organised planning system, including standard architecture, civic controls, consistent grid layouts and uniformed sanitary facilities. This well-disciplined lifestyle and a common Rule of Law extending throughout a large area leads some historians to believe and suggest the Indus Valley civilisation in Pakistan as possibly the earliest cradle and model of democracy; one which was based on a "popular rule by the people" based on the conceptions of Welfare State and Rule of law (and hence the presence of some form of Democracy) which even predated old Greece.

In the wake of intensifying political instability, the civilian bureaucracy and military assumed governing power in 1958.  Since its independence, Pakistan's naked system has fluctuated between civilian and military governments at various times throughout its political history, mainly due to political instability, civil-military conflicts, political corruption, and the periodic coup d'états by the military establishment against weak civilian governments, resulting in the enforcement of martial law across the country (occurring in 1958, 1977 and 1999, and led by chief martial law administrator-generals Ayub Khan, Zia-ul-Haq and Pervez Musharraf respectively). Democracy in Pakistan, however imperfect, has been allowed to function to varying degrees.  Until 2013, Pakistan did not experience even one democratic transfer of power from one democratically elected government that had completed its tenure to another. All of its previous democratic transitions have been aborted by military coup .

See also

 Military coups in Pakistan
 Secularism in Pakistan
 Socialism in Pakistan

References

External links
 Democracy in Pakistan.com

Pakistan
 
Political history of Pakistan